Colorado Museum of Natural History may refer to either

 University of Colorado Museum of Natural History at the University of Colorado in Boulder, Colorado
 the former name of the Denver Museum of Nature and Science in Denver, Colorado